The Shirley Center Historic District encompasses the original historic center of Shirley, Massachusetts.  The district is centered on the 1753 town common area, from which five roads (Brown, Center, Horsepond, Parker and Whitney Roads) radiate away.  The district includes the buildings that surround the common, as well as some that line these roads.  The district includes Shirley's town hall and First Parish Congregational Church.

The district features Greek Revival, Georgian, and Federal style architecture.  It was added to the National Register of Historic Places in 1988.

See also
National Register of Historic Places listings in Middlesex County, Massachusetts
Shirley Village Historic District

References

Historic districts in Middlesex County, Massachusetts
National Register of Historic Places in Middlesex County, Massachusetts
Historic districts on the National Register of Historic Places in Massachusetts